The South American Youth Championship 1985 was held in Asunción, Paraguay. It also served as qualification for the 1985 FIFA World Youth Championship.

Teams
The following teams entered the tournament:

 
 
 
 
 
 
  (host)

First round

Group A

Group B

Final round
Paraguay finished second in this group based on a better performance in the first round.

Qualification to World Youth Championship
The three best performing teams qualified for the 1985 FIFA World Youth Championship.

External links
Results by RSSSF

South American Youth Championship
1985 in youth association football
International sports competitions in Asunción
January 1985 sports events in South America
1980s in Asunción